Guido de Monte Rochen or Guy de Montrocher was a French priest and jurist who was active around 1331. He is best known as the author of Manipulus curatorum (the manual of the curate), a handbook for parish priests, that was often copied, with some 180 complete or partial manuscripts surviving, and later reprinted throughout Europe in the next 200 years, with at least 119 printings, and sales which have been estimated to be three times those of Thomas Aquinas' Summa Theologica. It became obsolete only when the Council of Trent created the Roman Catechism in 1566.

Printings

Austria
Printer of the 1482 'Vocabolista' (Stephan Koblinger?), Vienna, 1482

Belgium
Johannes de Westfalia, Leuven, 1483
Jean Beller, Antwerp, 1564

England
Richard Pynson, about 1497 and 1500
There were five more English printings of this book before 1520, including three editions by Wynkyn de Worde (1502, 1509, and 1517).

France
Petrus Caesaris, Paris, 1473 or 1474
So-called Printer of Pius II, Albi, 1475
"In vico S. Jacobi" (Au Soufflet Vert [Louis Symonel et Socii]), Paris, 1476 and 1479
Johannes de La Tour (de Turre) and Johannes Morelli, Angers, 1477 and 1495
Nicolaus Philippi, Lyon, about 1477, 1480, 1481 and 1488
Ulrich Gering, Paris, 1478 and 1480
Johannes Solidi (Schilling), Vienne, Isère, about 1478
Jean Bouyer, Poitiers, between 1479 and 1490, and 1495
Antoine Caillaut, Paris, 1482, 1483, 1490 and 1494
Guy Marchant, Paris, 1483
Guillaume Le Roy, Lyon, 1483, 1485 and 1487
Printer of the 1481 'Legenda Aurea', Strassburg, 1483
Henricus Mayer, Toulouse, 1484
Pierre Levet, Paris, 1487, 1488, 1489
Martin Flach, Strassburg, 1487, 1489, 1493 and 1499
Philippe Pigouchet, Paris, 1489 and 1491
Jean Du Pré, Lyon, 1490
Mathieu Vivian, Orléans, 1490 or 1491
Engelhardus Schultis, Lyon, about 1491
Jean Le Bourgeois, Rouen, 1493, 1494, 1497, 1498 and 1499
Félix Baligault, Paris, 1493
Martin Morin, Rouen, 1494, 1495 and 1496
Pierre Le Dru, Paris, 1494 and 1496
Georg Mittelhus, Paris, 1494
Jacques Le Forestier, Rouen, 1495 and 1497
Janon Carcain, Lyon, about 1495
Hémon David, Lyon, after 1495
Michael Le Noir, Paris, 1496
Mathieu Latheron, Tours, 1497
Etienne Jehannot, Paris, 1497
Michel Topié, Lyon, 1499
Richard Auzoult, Rouen, 1500
Jean de Vingle, Lyon, 1500

Later printings continue at least until the 1554 edition by Gulielmum Rouillium of Lyon.

Germany
Printer of Lotharius (Conrad Mancz?), 1474 or earlier
Bartholomaeus de Unkel, Cologne, 1476
Conrad Winters, de Homborch, Cologne, 1478 and 1481
Conrad Fyner, Esslingen am Neckar, about 1479
Johann Guldenschaff, Cologne, 1480
Christman Heyny, Augsburg, 1471 or 1481
Heinrich Quentell, Cologne, about 1484-89, 1492 and 1498
Johann Koelhoff, the Elder, Cologne, 1487

Italy
Christophorus Beyamus and Johannes Glim, Savigliano, 1473 or earlier
Johannes Reinhardi, Rome, 1476
"In domo Francisci de Cinquinis", Rome, 1477
Johannes Bulle, Rome, 1478
Johannes de Nördlingen, Bologna, 1480
Leonardus Pachel, Milan, 1481 and 1492
Eucharius Silber, Rome, 1481 and 1485
Andreas de Bonetis, Venice, 1483
Stephan Plannck, Rome, 1484, 1490 and 1496
Marinus Saracenus, Venice, 1486
Johannes Antonius de Honate, Milan, about 1488-89
Guilelmus Anima Mia, Tridinensis, Venice, 1489
Maximus de Butricis, Venice, 1491
Damianus de Mediolano, de Gorgonzola, Venice, 1493
Simon Bevilaqua, Venice, 1495
Christophorus de Pensis, de Mandello, Venice, 1498
Johannes Baptista Sessa, Venice, 1500

Portugal
German Gallarde, Lisbon, 1523

Spain
Mathaeus Flander (of Flanders), Zaragoza, 1475
Nicolaus Spindeler, Barcelona, 1479
Nicolaus Spindeler, Tarragona, 1484
Juan de Brocar, Alcalá de Henares, 1545
Pedro de Castro, Salamanca, 1550

Switzerland
Martin Flach, Basel, about 1478
Adam Steinschaber, Geneva, 1480
Michael Wenssler, Basel, about 1485
Louis Cruse, Geneva, 1487

Notes

Year of birth unknown
Year of death unknown
14th-century Latin writers
14th-century Spanish Roman Catholic priests